Hancock County is a county located in the northeastern part of the U.S. state of Tennessee. As of the 2020 census, the population was 6,662, making it the fourth-least populous county in Tennessee. Its county seat is Sneedville.

History
Hancock County was created from parts of Hawkins and Claiborne counties. The act establishing the county was passed by the state legislature in 1844, but several Hawkins residents sued to block its creation. In 1848, the Tennessee Supreme Court ruled in favor of the new county. The county seat, Sneedville, was named in honor of the attorney William H. Sneed, who represented the county in the court case. The county was named after the Revolutionary War patriot John Hancock.

Geography

Adjacent counties
Lee County, Virginia (north)
Scott County, Virginia (northeast)
Hawkins County (east)
Grainger County (southwest)
Claiborne County (west)

State protected areas
Kyles Ford Wildlife Management Area (part)

Major Highways
There are 3 primary state highways and 4 secondary state highways that run through Hancock County.
  (to / and Hawkins County)
  (Turns to   after the fork in Kyles Ford) then becomes  in VA. Southbound to Tazewell and Central Claiborne County)
  (To Harrogate and Northern Claiborne County)
  (Turns to  after the fork from SR 33 to the Virginia border. Then it becomes  in VA. Southbound goes to Rogersville)
  (to / and NE Grainger County)
 Back Valley Rd (Connects downtown Sneedville with other communities with a terminus at  going towards Tazewell)

Demographics

2020 census

As of the 2020 United States census, there were 6,662 people, 2,742 households, and 1,729 families residing in the county.

2010 census
At the 2010 United States Census, there were 6,819 people living in the county. 98.0% were White, 0.4% Black or African American, 0.3% Native American, 0.1% Asian, 0.1% of some other race and 1.1% of two or more races. 0.2% were Hispanic or Latino (of any race).

2000 census
At the 2000 census, there were 6,786 people, 2,769 households and 1,938 families living in the county.  The population density was 30 per square mile (12/km2). There were 3,280 housing units at an average density of 15 per square mile (6/km2). The racial makeup of the county was 97.91% White, 0.49% Black or African American, 0.24% Native American, 0.07% Asian, 0.01% Pacific Islander, 0.34% from other races, and 0.94% from two or more races. 0.37% of the population were Hispanic or Latino of any race.

There were 2,769 households, of which 31.00% had children under the age of 18 living with them, 55.10% were married couples living together, 11.00% had a female householder with no husband present, and 30.00% were non-families. 27.70% of all households were made up of individuals, and 13.50% had someone living alone who was 65 years of age or older. The average household size was 2.39 and the average family size was 2.91.

23.10% of the population were under the age of 18, 8.80% from 18 to 24, 26.90% from 25 to 44, 25.50% from 45 to 64, and 15.70% who were 65 years of age or older. The median age was 39 years. For every 100 females there were 95.10 males. For every 100 females age 18 and over, there were 94.30 males.

The median household income was $19,760, which was the lowest median household income of any county in Tennessee, and the 27th lowest in the United States. The median family income was $25,372. Males had a median income of $23,150 and females $18,199. The per capita income was $11,986. About 25.30% of families and 29.40% of the population were below the poverty line, including 37.50% of those under age 18 and 30.70% of those age 65 or over.

The county as of the fiscal year 2020, was designated as an "economically distressed" area by the state government, and is one of the poorest in the state. Hancock County is estimated to experience a massive population decline.

Culture
Hancock County is known particularly for its population of people of Melungeon ancestry, who are believed to be of mixed European, African, and Native American heritage.  The Vardy Community School, which provided state-mandated education for Melungeon children in the early 20th century, is now a historic site located in the Newman's Ridge area.

Communities

City
Sneedville (county seat)

Unincorporated communities
Alanthus Hill
Kyles Ford
Mulberry Gap
Treadway
Xenophon

Politics

Like all of Unionist East Tennessee, Hancock County has been overwhelmingly Republican since the Civil War. Since the Republican Party first contested the state in 1868, every official Republican nominee has gained an absolute majority of Hancock County's vote, even William Howard Taft during 1912 when the GOP was bitterly divided. The only post-Civil War Democratic presidential nominee to even reach forty percent of Hancock County's vote has been Bill Clinton in 1992, when he was aided by the local popularity of Tennessee Senator Al Gore, whose native home is in Smith County, Tennessee.

See also
National Register of Historic Places listings in Hancock County, Tennessee

References

Further reading
Johnson, Mattie Ruth (1997). My Melungeon Heritage: A Story of Life on Newman's Ridge. Johnson City, Tennessee: Overmountain Press.
Price, Henry R. (1966). "Melungeons: The Vanishing Colony of Newman's Ridge." Conference paper. American Studies Association of Kentucky and Tennessee. March 25–26, 1967.
Winkler, Wayne (2004) "Walking Toward the Sunset: The Melungeons of Appalachia," Macon, Georgia: Mercer University Press

External links

Official website

The Hancock County Public Library website
 Hancock County, TNGenWeb - free genealogy resources for the county
Sneedville/Hancock Chamber & Community Partners, Inc. website

 
Counties of Appalachia
1844 establishments in Tennessee
Populated places established in 1844
East Tennessee